The 3rd National Spelling Bee was held at the National Museum in Washington, D.C. on June 23, 1927, hosted by the Louisville Courier-Journal. Scripps-Howard would not sponsor the Bee until 1941.

The winner was 13-year-old Dean Lucas of West Salem, Ohio (some sources say nearby Congress, Ohio, where he attended school), with the word abrogate. Ralph Keenan, 13, of Waukon, Iowa placed second (misspelling "abrogate" as "abregate"), and Minerva Ressler, 12, of Lancaster, Pennsylvania was third. It was Lucas' second appearance at the bee.

There were 17 contestants this year, 13 girls and 4 boys, between ages 10 and 15, and the bee lasted three hours. The first place prize was $1000, with $500 for second, and $250 for third.

References

03
1927 in Washington, D.C.
1927 in education
June 1927 events